Austroterpna paratorna is a moth of the  family Geometridae. It is found in Australia.

Moths of Australia
Moths described in 1888
Pseudoterpnini